After Like is the third single album by South Korean girl group Ive. It was released by Starship Entertainment on August 22, 2022, and contains two tracks, including the lead single of the same name.

Background and release
On July 24, 2022, Starship Entertainment announced that Ive would be releasing their third single album, After Like, on August 22. On August 1, a promotional video titled "I've Summer Film" was released. Six days later, the promotional scheduled was released. On August 7, the track listing was released, with "After Like" confirmed as the lead single. The music video teaser for "After Like" was released on August 19, followed by the album's highlight medley video on August 21. After Like was released alongside the lead single's music video on August 22.

Composition
After Like consists of two tracks that incorporate elements of nu-disco. Lead single "After Like" is a pop and house song that samples "I Will Survive" by Gloria Gaynor with lyrics about "showing your love methods with actions rather than your heart". The second track, "My Satisfaction", was described as a dance-pop song with a "heavy beat".

Commercial performance
After Like debuted at number one on South Korea's Circle Album Chart in the chart issue dated August 21–27, 2022, with over 1 million copies sold.

Track listing

Credits and personnel
Credits adapted from Melon.

 Ive – vocals 
Rei – rap lyrics 
 Mommy Son – rap lyrics 
 Seo Ji-eum – lyrics 
 Lee Seu-ran – lyrics 
 Ryan S. Jhun – composition, arrangement 
 Anders Nilsen – composition, arrangement 
  – composition 
 Iselin Solheim – composition 
 Josh Cumbee – composition, arrangement 
 Afshin Salmani – composition, arrangement 
 Nat Dunn – composition 
 Ilan Kidron – composition 
 Anna Timgren – composition 
 Justin Reinstein – composition 
 Avin – arrangement 
 Slay – arrangement

Charts

Weekly charts

Monthly charts

Year-end charts

Certifications and sales

Accolades

Release history

References

Ive (group) albums
Korean-language albums
Single albums
Starship Entertainment albums